The 2010 King George VI and Queen Elizabeth Stakes was a horse race held at Ascot Racecourse on Saturday 24 July 2010. It was the 60th King George VI and Queen Elizabeth Stakes.

The winner was the Highclere "Admiral Rous" syndicate's Harbinger, a four-year-old bay colt trained at Newmarket, Suffolk by Michael Stoute and ridden by Olivier Peslier. Harbinger's victory was the first for his jockey and owner and the fifth for Stoute after Shergar (1981), Opera House (1993) Golan (2002) and Conduit (2009).

The race
Michael Stoute trained three of the six runners for the race, with the Epsom Derby winner Workforce being made the 8/11 favourite and the Joel Stakes winner Confront being employed as a pacemaker. His third runner, Harbinger, had won the John Porter Stakes, Ormonde Stakes and Hardwicke Stakes in 2010 and was made the 4/1 second favourite. Ryan Moore, who had ridden Harbinger in all his previous races, opted to partner Workforce, allowing the French jockey Olivier Peslier to take the ride on the four-year-old. The other runners were Cape Blanco, who had defeated Workforce in the Dante Stakes and subsequently won the Irish Derby, Youmzain, three times runner-up in the Prix de l'Arc de Triomphe and the French filly Daryakana, winner of the Hong Kong Vase.

Confront set a strong pace from Workforce and Cape Blanco, with Harbinger in fourth. When the pacemaker weakened early in the straight Cape Blanco briefly took the lead as Workforce began to struggle, but Peslier produced Harbinger with a strong run on the outside to gain the advantage approaching the final furlong. In the closing stages Harbinger drew away from his opponents to win by eleven lengths in a time of 2:26.78. Both the winning margin and the winning time established new records for the race. Cape Blanco stayed on to take second, three and a quarter lengths ahead of Youmzain, with Daryakana fourth, Workforce fifth and Confront last of the six runners.

Race details
 Sponsor: Betfair
 Purse: £984,700; First prize: £567,700
 Surface: Turf
 Going: Good
 Distance: 12 furlongs
 Number of runners: 6
 Winner's time: 2:26.78

Full result

 Abbreviations: nse = nose; nk = neck; shd = head; hd = head

Winner's details
Further details of the winner, Harbinger
 Sex: Colt
 Foaled: 12 March 2006
 Country: United Kingdom
 Sire: Dansili; Dam: Penang Pearl (Bering)
 Owner: Highclere "Admiral Rous"
 Breeder:  A. K. H. Ooi

References

King George
 2010
King George VI and Queen Elizabeth Stakes
King George VI and Queen Elizabeth Stakes
2010s in Berkshire